Turbonique was a company founded in 1962 by Clarence Eugene "Gene" Middlebrooks Jr of Orlando, Florida.
Middlebrooks, born 3 August 1931, was a native of Jonesboro, Georgia, had studied mechanical engineering at Georgia Tech and had worked for aerospace contractor Martin-Marietta on the propulsion system for the Pershing missile program.

The company specialized in products built around very compact low cost gas turbines built for high power output during brief periods.
The turbine was fuelled by an isopropyl nitrate monopropellant that they sold under the brand name "Thermolene".
In addition to the fuel, the main products sold by the company were:
 Micro turbine engines, ranging from the  "S-2" up to the  "S-28", weighing only .
 "AP", for Auxiliary Power, a piston engine supplemental supercharger driven by its own micro-turbine which could be engaged by a switch. The device was heavily based on Middlebrook's patent .
 Conventional exhaust driven turbochargers.
 "TB-28", the "drag axle", a micro-turbine to be mounted directly to the rear axle of a vehicle. It would supplement the power of the conventional engine, usually driving the axle via a Borg Warner sprag clutch, and was intended for drag racing.
 Rocket thrust engines, in various sizes. The "T-16" had  of thrust. There were also higher powered models, like the T-21, T-22 and T-32. They were used to power cars, motorcycles (Evel Knievel planned to use one for a jump over Grand Canyon) as well as boats and more.
The company was mostly based on mail order, and was a frequent advertiser in magazines, using gramophone records and 8mm film in addition to a catalog as promotional material.
A 1955 VW Beetle named the "Black Widow", clocking 9.36 seconds  quarter miles equipped with a Turbonique drag axle at the Tampa Dragstrip in 1965, occurred frequently in advertisements. When it crashed, becoming airborne after reaching , this event was also advertised, saying "we forgot our strength for a split second".

Being based on rocket fuel and technology, there were a number of safety issues with these devices. For instance if the operator let off the throttle,  then reapplied it, the device would essentially become a bomb. In 1967, after a few reported incidents and fatalities, the NHRA banned the use of Turbonique turbines for drag racing. 

In 1968, Middlebrooks was accused and jailed for mail fraud mostly based on the goods supplied by Turbonique being more difficult and more expensive to finish and install than described in the advertisements. At the trial, Middlebrooks waived counsel and represented himself. An appeal in 1972, stating that he suffered from hypomania at the time, was rejected. The company folded shortly after the court case. Middlebrooks died on 4 August 2005.

References

External links
 Turbonique gallery and advertisements
 Early Turbonique catalogue and technical manual

Defunct companies based in Florida
Automotive motorsports and performance companies
Automotive companies established in 1962
Turbocharger manufacturers
Supercharging